Takadiastase is a form of diastase which results from the growth, development, and nutrition of a distinct microscopic fungus known as Aspergillus oryzae (Koji). Takadiastase is named after Jōkichi Takamine, who developed the method first used for its extraction.

External links 
Jokichi Takamine Taka-Diastase, Adrenaline History of industrial property rights (Japan Patent Office)
 Development of Takadiastase

Hydrolases

ja:ジアスターゼ